Hanna or Hannah is an Irish and Scottish surname, ultimately of Irish origin from O'Hannaidh, or descendants of the lowland Clan Hannay. 

Hanna (ܚܲܢܵܐ) is also an Assyrian surname, a shortened form of Yohannan, the Aramaic equivalent for John. 

Notable people with the surnames include:

Hanna 
 Arthur Dion Hanna (1928–2021), Governor-General of the Bahamas
 Billy Hanna (c. 1929–1975), Northern Irish loyalist and Ulster Volunteer Force leader
 Charles Hanna (1889–1942), American politician
 Ciara Hanna (born 1991), American actress and model
 David Blyth Hanna (1858–1938), Canadian railway executive
 Delphine Hanna (1854–1941), American physical education professor
 Edward A. Hanna (1922-2009), American politician
 Edward Joseph Hanna (1860–1944), American bishop
 Gabbie Hanna (born 1991), American Internet personality
 Gertrud Hanna (1876–1944), German activist and politician
 Gila Hanna (born 1934), Canadian mathematics educator and philosopher of mathematics
 Jack Hanna (born 1947), American animal expert
 James Hanna (died 1787), British maritime fur trader
 James Hanna (born 1989) American football player
 James Hanna (1816-1872), American judge
 Jenn Hanna (born 1980), Canadian curler
 Jim Hanna (c. 1947–1974), Northern Irish loyalist and Ulster Volunteer Force leader
 John A. Hanna (1762–1805), United States Representative from Pennsylvania
 John G. Hanna (1889–1948), American sailboat designer
 John Hanna (Indiana politician) (1827–1882), United States Representative from Indiana
 Kate Hanna (born 1996), Australian field hockey player
 Kathleen Hanna (born 1968), American musician, activist and writer
 Lucy Hanna, American photographer
 Marjorie Hanna, Canadian ballplayer, All-American Girls Professional Baseball League
 Mark Hanna (1837–1904), American industrialist and US Senator
 Mark Hanna (screenwriter) (1917–2003), American screenwriter and actor
 Ray Hanna (1928–2005), New Zealand-born RAF officer, later a civilian pilot and 'warbird' collector
 Richard L. Hanna (1951-2020), United States Representative from New York
 Roland Hanna (1932–2002), American jazz pianist
 Stanley S. Hanna (1920–2012), American physicist
 Stephen Hanna, New York City Ballet principal dancer
 Vincent Hanna (1939–1997), Northern Irish television journalist
 William Hanna (1910–2001), American animator and co-founder of Hanna-Barbera
 William T. "Bill" Hanna (1930-2016), American politician

Hannah 
 Alan Hannah (born 1971), Scottish curler and coach
 Barry Hannah (1942–2010), American author
 Bob Hannah (baseball), American college baseball coach
 Brook Hannah (1874–1961), Australian rules footballer and missionary
 Daryl Hannah (born 1960), American actress
 David Hannah (born 1973), Scottish (association) football player
 Jack Hannah (1913–1994), American director of animated shorts
 John A. Hannah (1902–1991), president of Michigan State University
 John D. Hannah, American author and professor
 John P. Hannah (born 1962), senior aide on national security to Dick Cheney
 John Hannah (actor) (born 1962), Scottish actor
 John Hannah (American football) (born 1951), American former left guard for the New England Patriots
 John Hannah (VC) (1921–1947), Scottish recipient of the Victoria Cross

de:Hannah (Begriffsklärung)
simple:Hannah